"Crunk Muzik" is a song by rapper Jim Jones from his debut studio album On My Way to Church. It was produced by The Blackout Movement and features rappers Juelz Santana and Cam'ron. It was also featured on The Diplomats' album, Diplomatic Immunity 2.

Music video
The video for the song, released in late 2004, based on the 1970s film The Warriors, features a gang of men in masks and rollerblades, wielding metal chains. It also shows minister Benjamin Chavis preaching to the gang with a group of well-dressed, young black men. Also, a scene in the video features a brash, unkempt, and heavily accented French man tapping two empty Sizzurp bottles together, yelling "Dipset, come out and play! Dipset, come out and play!"

Chart positions

References

External links
Jim Jones ft. Juelz Santana & Cam'ron - Crunk Muzik Music Video

2004 singles
2004 songs
Jim Jones (rapper) songs
Juelz Santana songs
Cam'ron songs
Songs written by Jim Jones (rapper)
MNRK Music Group singles